In algebra, the Wedderburn–Artin theorem is a classification theorem for semisimple rings and semisimple algebras.  The theorem states that an (Artinian) semisimple ring R is isomorphic to a product of finitely many -by- matrix rings over division rings , for some integers , both of which are uniquely determined up to permutation of the index .  In particular, any simple left or right Artinian ring is isomorphic to an n-by-n matrix ring over a division ring D, where both n and D are uniquely determined.

Theorem 
Let  be a (Artinian) semisimple ring. Then  is isomorphic to a product of finitely many -by- matrix rings  over division rings , for some integers , both of which are uniquely determined up to permutation of the index . 

Note that if  is a finite-dimensional simple algebra over a division ring E, D need not be contained in E.  For example, matrix rings over the complex numbers are finite-dimensional simple algebras over the real numbers.

Corollary 1 

The Wedderburn–Artin theorem implies that every simple ring that is finite-dimensional over a division ring is isomorphic to an n-by-n matrix ring over a division ring D, where both n and D are uniquely determined. This is Joseph Wedderburn's original result. Emil Artin later generalized it to the case of left or right Artinian rings.

Corollary 2 

Let  be an algebraically closed field. Let  be a semisimple ring, that is a finite-dimensional -algebra.

Consequence 

See also
 Maschke's theorem
 Brauer group
 Jacobson density theorem
 Hypercomplex number
 Emil Artin
 Joseph Wedderburn

References

 P. M. Cohn (2003) Basic Algebra: Groups, Rings, and Fields, pages 137–9.
 
 

Theorems in ring theory